Sergey Gorbunov (10 July 1970 – 18 December 2001) was a Russian volleyball player. He competed in the men's tournament at the 1992 Summer Olympics.

References

1970 births
2001 deaths
Russian men's volleyball players
Olympic volleyball players of the Unified Team
Volleyball players at the 1992 Summer Olympics
Sportspeople from Nizhny Novgorod
20th-century Russian people